"Crazy Times" is a song recorded and performed by Jars of Clay. The song was a writing collaboration between the band members Dan Haseltine and Stephen Mason with songwriters Mark Hudson and Greg Wells. It was the first single from their second studio album, Much Afraid. The single fared well in the mainstream, peaking at No. 38 on the Billboard Modern Rock Tracks chart. The demo version of the song can be found on the album The White Elephant Sessions, while a live version of the song is included on the 2003 double album, Furthermore: From the Studio, From the Stage. This song also appears on the WOW 1999 compilation album.

Track listing

US radio promo
"Crazy Times" (Album Version) - 3:34 (Dan Haseltine, Stephen Mason, Mark Hudson, & Greg Wells)

UK commercial single
"Crazy Times" - 3:34 (Dan Haseltine, Stephen Mason, Mark Hudson, & Greg Wells)
"The Chair" - 5:21 (Charlie Lowell, Dan Haseltine, Matt Odmark, & Stephen Mason)
"Weighed Down" - 3:39 (Charlie Lowell, Dan Haseltine, Matt Odmark, & Stephen Mason)

US maxi-single
"Crazy Times" - 3:37 (Dan Haseltine, Stephen Mason, Mark Hudson, & Greg Wells)
"The Chair" - 5:21 (Charlie Lowell, Dan Haseltine, Matt Odmark, & Stephen Mason)
"Frail" (from the original demo) - 4:05 (Charlie Lowell, Dan Haseltine, Matt Bronleewe, & Stephen Mason)
"Sleepers" - 1:51 (Charlie Lowell, Dan Haseltine, Matt Odmark, & Stephen Mason)

Personnel 

Performance
Dan Haseltine - vocals
Charlie Lowell - keyboards, piano, organ, background vocals
Stephen Mason - guitars, bass guitar, background vocals
Matt Odmark - guitars, background vocals
Greg Wells - drums, percussion

 Technical
Stephen Lipson - producer
Robert Beeson - executive producer
Heff Moraes - engineering, mixing
Chuck Linder - recording
Mike Griffith - engineering
Adam Hatley - engineering assistant
Stephen Marcussen - mastering
Don C. Tyler - digital editing

Charts
 No. 1 Christian CHR
 No. 38 Billboard Modern Rock Tracks

References

External links
Official music video on YouTube
 Jesus Freak Hideout review

1997 singles
Jars of Clay songs
Songs written by Greg Wells
Songs written by Mark Hudson (musician)
Songs written by Dan Haseltine
Songs written by Stephen Mason (musician)
Song recordings produced by Stephen Lipson
Essential Records (Christian) singles
1997 songs